The Barlow River is a river in the Westland district of the South Island of New Zealand. It is a tributary of the Perth River. The Barlow River is fed by the Barlow and Farrar Glacier. Its tributary North Barlow River is fed by the Escape and Siege Glacier.

See also
List of rivers of New Zealand

Weblink
Land Information New Zealand - Search for Place Names

References

Westland District
Rivers of the West Coast, New Zealand
Rivers of New Zealand